Zuleikha (Zuleihka otkrivaet glaza [Zuleikha Opens Her Eyes]) is a debut novel written in 2015 by the Russian author Guzel Yakhina. It describes the lives of various people, including the titular protagonist, struggling to survive in exile in Siberia from 1930 to 1946.

The book won the Yasnaya Polyana Literary Award and the Big Book Award in 2015. It has been translated into twenty-one languages.

Plot summary

In 1930, Zuleikha lives in a small Tatar village in the Soviet Union with her husband Murtaza and her mother-in-law. Her husband treats her terribly and favors her mother-in-law heavily. Her mother-in-law is extremely ungrateful for everything Zuleikha does for her. Zuleikha is considered a failure because she has attempted to have 4 different children but all have died.  As part of the dekulakization campaign, her husband is executed by Ignatov for refusing to leave. She is then forced to exile to siberia with him while they go on a lengthy journey to a new "Settlement". Ignatov is not interested in Zuleikha and has a woman of his own at home but ends up getting trapped in this just as much as Zuleikha. After an extremely length waiting time and train ride where some people manage to escape they arrive at the port. The port takes them down the river to their settlement and sinks along the way. The result is many who were trapped on the boat and locked up ended up drowning. Zuliekha tries to save them and almost drowns her self but Ignatov saves her. This settlement turns out to be nothing more than some forest with minimal supplies if any. The remainder of the story takes place at this settlement and develops eventually into a real settlement. The first winter is harsh and many die but thanks to Ignatovs leadership and Zuilkhas hunting skills they survive. Many recruits arrive in the spring and don't make it through the harsh winter.

The novel is a historical fiction inspired by stories told to the author by her grandmother, although real incidents in the novel are based on the memoirs of other people. The fictional setting of the novel is based on the labor settlement Pit-Gorodok in Severo-Yeniseysky District, where the author's grandmother was exiled as a child along with her parents.

Adaptions

A Russian language, eight episode television mini-series, Zuleikha Opens Her Eyes, premiered on the TV channel Russia 1 in 2020. The series stars Chulpan Khamatova, Evgeniy Morozov and Sergey Makovetskiy and was directed by Egor Anashkin. The show received unexpectedly broad acclaim from both Russophone and Anglophone publications.

References

External links
 

2015 novels
Novels about political repression in the Soviet Union
Novels set in the Stalin era
Russian novels
21st-century Russian novels
2015 debut novels